Elivélton Alves Rufino, commonly known simply as Elivélton (born 31 July 1971), is a Brazilian former footballer who played as a midfielder for several Campeonato Brasileiro Série A clubs. He also played for the Brazil national team.

Club career 
Born in Serrania, Minas Gerais state, Elivélton started his professional career in 1990, when he joined São Paulo, after leaving his youth club Esportiva de Passos. Defending São Paulo, he won the Campeonato Paulista in 1991 and in 1992, the Série A in 1991, the Copa Libertadores in 1992 and in 1993, and the Intercontinental Cup in 1993. In 1994, he won the J1 League, being awarded as the best foreigner player in the league, while playing for Nagoya Grampus Eight. He then was transferred to Corinthians, and won that season's Copa do Brasil and the Campeonato Paulista. Elivélton won the Campeonato Paulista again, in 1996, this time with Corinthians' biggest rival, Palmeiras. After joining Cruzeiro in 1997, he won the Copa Libertadores again, and also won the Campeonato Mineiro. In the subsequent years, he played for several clubs, Internacional, Ponte Preta, São Caetano, Bahia, Uberlândia, Vitória-ES, and União Rondonópolis. Elivélton won the Campeonato Capixaba in 2006, while defending Vitória-ES. He joined Francana in 2007, after spending some time training in his academy in Alfenas, Minas Gerais state.

International career 
He played four games, between 1991 and 1992, scoring two goals for the Brazilian Olympic team. Both goals were scored on January 22, 1991, against the United States team. Elivélton played eleven games for the Brazilian main team, including two Copa América games in 1993, respectively against Peru on June 18, and Chile on June 21. The first game was played on October 30, 1991, against Yugoslavia, while the last game was played on August 8, 1993, against Mexico. His only goal was scored on December 18, 1991, against Czechoslovakia.

Career statistics

Club

International

References

External links

1971 births
Living people
Sportspeople from Minas Gerais
Brazilian footballers
São Paulo FC players
Nagoya Grampus players
Sport Club Corinthians Paulista players
Sociedade Esportiva Palmeiras players
Cruzeiro Esporte Clube players
Esporte Clube Vitória players
Sport Club Internacional players
Associação Atlética Ponte Preta players
Associação Desportiva São Caetano players
Esporte Clube Bahia players
Uberlândia Esporte Clube players
Vitória Futebol Clube (ES) players
Brazil international footballers
Brazilian expatriate footballers
Expatriate footballers in Japan
Campeonato Brasileiro Série A players
J1 League players
1993 Copa América players
Association football midfielders
União Esporte Clube players